Walnut Prairie is an unincorporated community in Clark County, Illinois, United States, located along Illinois Route 1,  south of Marshall.

Walter E. Cork (1886–1958), Illinois state representative and businessman, was born in Walnut Prairie.

References

Unincorporated communities in Clark County, Illinois
Unincorporated communities in Illinois